Hadji Samanhudi (1868 – 28 December 1956) was the founder of Sarekat Dagang Islam, an organization in Indonesia that previously served as an association for batik traders in Surakarta, and later broadened its scope to nationalist political issues.

Born in Lawiyan, Solo as Soedarno Nadi, he was educated until the highschool-equivalent SR (Sekolah Rakyat) but he didn't graduate. He then studied Islam in Surabaya. At the same time he began trading in batik.

Samanhudi founded Sarekat Dagang Islam, or Islamic Trade Union, in 1911. The Union consists of batik entrepreneurs in East and Central Java with the goal to improve their market hold against Chinese competition. The members of the organization were unified by a common religion, Islam, albeit one with many influences from local mysticism and tradition. Samanhudi remained as its chairman until 1914, two years after Tjokroaminoto transformed the trading organization into a political one.

Since 1920, Samanhudi became inactive in the party. His health declined, but his interest on national movements never calmed down. He retreated from the public spotlight, until after Indonesia's independence, when he resumed his activity. In participation of defending Republic of Indonesia against the formerly-colonist Dutch military aggression, Samanhudi formed Solo Branch of Indonesian Rebel Front (Barisan Pemberontak Indonesia Cabang Solo) and Pancasila Union Branch (Cabang Persatuan Pancasila). When the Netherlands launched the second aggression, he formed an army named Hawk Union Movement (Gerakan Kesatuan Alap-alap), which was assigned to provide logistical supplies for union armies fighting in the front line. There were many services he gave when Indonesian National Revolution took place.

Samanhudi died in Klaten on 28 December 1956, and was buried in Banaran, Grogol, Sukoharjo.

References
 Blumberger, J. Th. Petrus. (1931). De Nationalistische Beweging in Nederlandsch-Indië. Haarlem: H.D. Tjeenk Willink & Zoon N.V.
 McVey, Ruth T. (1963). ed. Indonesia. New Haven: Human Relations Area Files, Inc.

1868 births
1956 deaths
People from Surakarta
National Heroes of Indonesia
Sarekat Islam politicians
Burials in Java